The Joint Intelligence Training Group (JITG) is based at MOD Chicksands in Bedfordshire, approximately  north of London. The site was formerly the home of the Defence Intelligence and Security Centre (DISC) after it moved from Ashford in 1997. DISC was renamed as JITG on 1 January 2015.

Site History

Chicksands was the site of RAF Chicksands, an RAF signals collection station during and after the Second World War; during the war, it was one of the "Y-Stations" which sent intercepted signals to the Government Code and Cypher School (GC&CS) at Bletchley Park, where ciphers and codes of several Axis countries were decrypted, most importantly the ciphers generated by the German Enigma and Lorenz machines.  The station was used by the United States Air Force from 1950 to 1995, also for signals collection, being the location for its first  diameter FLR-9 direction finding antenna, commonly known as the Elephant Cage, from 1963 to 1995.  The site was closed as an RAF station in 1997, then handed over to the Intelligence Corps allowing the Corps Headquarters and training delivery to re-locate from Templer Barracks in Ashford, Kent.

Channel 4's Time Team visited the base in 2001 and excavated areas in front of and around the priory. One of the unusual finds was the remains of a 45-year old woman. The bones were studied and carbon-dated and almost four years after they were unearthed, the bones were re-buried by the military chaplain on the base in August 2005. The Time Team were unsure who the woman was, but they believed her to be a commoner rather than a member of the Gilbertine Order.

In 2003, the Double Agent Alfredo 'Freddie' Scappaticci (codenamed 'Stakeknife') was debriefed at the base when his cover was blown. Scappaticci had been working for the IRA but informing on them to the Ministry of Defence, who were said to have been paying him £80,000 a year.

In April 2004, the former US Elementary School site was sold off to Mid-Bedfordshire Council to enable consolidation of two council offices in Biggleswade and Ampthill. The site was located at the extreme southern end of the base where it backs onto the crossroads on the A507 road by Campton village. The funds raised from this allowed the unit to build new accommodation blocks for officers and other ranks on the base.

Defence College of Intelligence

The Defence College of Intelligence (DCI) is responsible for delivering training in intelligence and security to members of the British Armed Forces, police and other public sector staff as well as international partners.  Training is delivered over three sites, Chicksands, the Defence Centre for Languages and Culture, MOD Shrivenham and the Defence School of Photography at the Defence School of Aeronautical Engineering at Cosford.

JITG trains 5,000 students a year across all disciplines including the Defence Humint Unit and diaspora training sites such as the Defence School of Photography.

HQ Intelligence Corps

The Headquarters of the Intelligence Corps is located on site, with all core training for Intelligence Corps soldiers and officers being delivered through the DCI.

HMS Ferret

 is a training unit of the Royal Naval Reserve which delivers intelligence-related operational capability.

Other resident units
Defence HUMINT Unit (DHU)
Military Intelligence Museum (formerly Intelligence Corps Museum)
Army Cadet Force detachment

References

External links
 Annual Report & Accounts, 31 March 2005

Images
 
 Priory Entrance Hallway

Buildings and structures in Bedfordshire
Central Bedfordshire District
Education in Bedfordshire
Intelligence Corps (United Kingdom)
Military installations of the United Kingdom
Military units and formations in Bedfordshire
Organisations based in Bedfordshire
United Kingdom intelligence community